Rodney-O & Joe Cooley, consisting of rapper Rodney Oliver, also known as "Rodney O", DJ Joe Cooley (August 15 1965) and Jeffrey Page, also known as "General Jeff", is an American rap group from Southern California. Rodney O, from Riverside, and Joe Cooley, from Compton, and General Jeff, from Los Angeles. Best known for tracks such as "Everlasting Bass," "Cooley High," and "This is for the Homies." At the height of their popularity, the group toured with MC Lyte, N.W.A, Kool Moe Dee and Grandmaster Flash. The group would gain more popularity in South Florida than their native Southern California, giving them a pioneering role in Miami bass.

Though their 1987 song "Everlasting Bass" never charted, it is their best-remembered song. In 2015, Rolling Stone named it as one of the 20 greatest West Coast Rap Songs released prior to N.W.A's 1988 album Straight Outta Compton.

After over a decade of silence, the group announced that they were planning a new album in 2011. The album was tentatively titled Joe And Me, but only the single "That Supa Radio" materialized.

Discography

Albums
 1988 Me And Joe (Egyptian Empire) U.S. No. 187
 1990 Three the Hard Way (Atlantic) U.S. No. 128
 1991 Get Ready to Roll (Ichiban Records)
 1993 Fuck New York (Psychotic)
 1995 Everlasting Hits: The Best Of Rodney O & Joe Cooley (React)
 1998 The Final Chapter (React America)
 1999 Veteran's Day (Kritical)

Charting singles

References

External links
 audio Interview with Rodney-O & complete Biography on westcoastpioneers

Hip hop groups from California
Hip hop duos
American musical duos
Musicians from Compton, California